Tragedy of a Marriage (German: Tragödie einer Ehe) is a 1927 German silent drama film directed by Maurice Elvey and starring Isobel Elsom, Alfred Abel and Paul Richter. It is also known by the alternative title of Human Law. It is still extant.

The film's sets were designed by the art director Artur Günther and Ernst Stern.

Cast
 Isobel Elsom as Louise Radcliffe 
 Alfred Abel as Radcliffe 
 Paul Richter as Mason 
 Eduard von Winterstein
 Frida Richard
 Ernö Verebes

References

Bibliography
 Bock, Hans-Michael & Bergfelder, Tim. The Concise CineGraph. Encyclopedia of German Cinema. Berghahn Books, 2009.

External links

1927 films
Films of the Weimar Republic
German silent feature films
German black-and-white films
1927 drama films
German drama films
Films directed by Maurice Elvey
UFA GmbH films
Silent drama films
1920s German films
1920s German-language films